Lakeridge High School is a four-year public secondary school in Lake Oswego, Oregon, a suburb south of Portland. The second high school in the Lake Oswego School District, it first opened in 1971.

Academics
In 1987, Lakeridge High School was honored in the Blue Ribbon Schools Program, the highest honor a school can receive in the United States.

In 2008, 90% of the school's seniors received a high school diploma. Of 261 students, 234 graduated, 15 dropped out, nine received a modified diploma, and three were still in high school in 2009.

The school received a silver ranking in U.S. News & World Reports 2010 "America's Best High Schools" survey.

Athletics
State Championships
Football (1987) 
Boys Soccer (1978, 1979*, 1980, 1982, 2004, 2016) 
Girls Soccer (1982, 1989*) 
Volleyball (2013)

Notable alumni 
 Yeat - mainstream rapper, internet celebrity, songwriter; class of 2018
 Marisa Abegg, professional soccer player
 J. J. Birden - former NFL wide receiver
 Amelia Boone - 4x obstacle racing world champion
 Erin Chambers - actress, played Siobhan on General Hospital
 Travis Cole - former NFL and Arena Football League player
 Steve Coury - former Oregon State All-American WR and current Head Coach of the Lake Oswego High School football team
 Jillian Harmon - collegiate and Olympic basketball player
 Cooper Hummel - MLB outfielder; Class of 2013
 C. W. Jensen - retired Portland police captain, TV personality
 Kennedy - former MTV VJ, political satirist 
 Cathy Marshall - news anchor
 Sam Martin - professional singer, songwriter 
 Bart Miadich - Major League Baseball pitcher 
 Doug Nussmeier - NFL quarterback, college football coach; class of 1989 
 Jason Palumbis - football player, Stanford University quarterback; class of 1987 
 Erik Wilhelm - NFL quarterback, Cincinnati Bengals; class of 1984 
 Kevin & Dan Hageman - film/television screenwriters, producers

Footnotes

Further reading

 Kyle Swenson, "Oregon Teen was Excited to Join her High School Dance Team. Then She Learned About the Maple Syrup Wrestling," Washington Post, November 3, 2017.

External links
 

Lake Oswego, Oregon
High schools in Clackamas County, Oregon
Educational institutions established in 1971
Public high schools in Oregon
1971 establishments in Oregon